Faustino Trebbi (Budrio, 1761 – Bologna, 1836) was an Italian architect and ornamental painter, often active in painting quadratura frescoes.

His son Raffaele learned painting from his father; while his son Mauro became a professor of Chemistry. One of his pupils was Francesco Cocchi. He helped decorate the church of the Suffragio in Bologna. The chapel of the baptistery in San Lorenzo in Budrio was frescoed by Trebbi.

References

1836 deaths
1761 births
18th-century Italian painters
Italian male painters
19th-century Italian painters
Quadratura painters
Painters from Bologna
19th-century Italian male artists
18th-century Italian male artists